Hameed Al-Qushaibi (1 January 1956  – c. 9 July 2014) was a Yemeni brigadier in the Yemeni Army. He quit his position as Head of the 310th armoured Brigade in the 'Amran Governorate during the 2011 Yemeni uprising. He later resumed his position, but was reportedly killed in 2014 by Houthi militants during the Battle of Amran on 9 July.

References

Yemeni military officers
1956 births
2014 deaths
Yemeni military personnel killed in action
People from 'Amran Governorate

People from Amran Governorate
Yemeni Military Academy alumni
21st-century Yemeni military personnel